The following table indicates the party of elected officials in the U.S. state of New Hampshire:
Governor

The table also indicates the historical party composition in the:
Executive Council
State Senate
State House of Representatives
State delegation to the U.S. Senate
State delegation to the U.S. House of Representatives

For years in which a presidential election was held, the table indicates which party's nominees received the state's electoral votes.

Pre-statehood–1882

1883–present

References

See also
Politics in New Hampshire
Politics of New Hampshire
Elections in New Hampshire

Politics of New Hampshire
Government of New Hampshire
New Hampshire